Yasumi Naomasa (安見 直政; ? – 1572) was a military commander in the Azuchi-Momoyama period. 
A dominant retainer of Hatakeyama clan, he ruled Katano and Iimoriyama castles.

He conspired with Yusa Naganori and Yusa Nobunori to overthrow his lord. He then approached  Oda Nobunaga after falling out with Nobunori and served Nobunaga to guarantee his own safety.

References

1572 deaths
Samurai
Year of birth unknown